Milwaukee Appeal (foaled 2006 in Ontario) is a Canadian thoroughbred racehorse.

Background
Milwaukee Appeal was bred and raced by businessman Eugene George under his nom de course, C.E.C. Farms. She was sired by Milwaukee Brew, one of only three horses to ever win back-to-back runnings of the Santa Anita Handicap. Her grandsire, Wild Again, won the 1984 Breeders' Cup Classic. Her dam, Appealing Forum, is a daughter of Open Forum, who won the Risen Star Stakes and is a son of two-time Leading sire in North America and Canadian Horse Racing Hall of Fame inductee Deputy Minister. Based at Woodbine Racetrack in Toronto, Ontario. Milwaukee Appeal is trained by Scott Fairlie.

Racing career
The filly's 2009 season was highlighted by a win in the Woodbine Oaks in which she was ridden by Canadian-born jockey Stewart Elliott, who won the 2004 Kentucky Derby aboard Smarty Jones. With Elliott aboard again, Milwaukee Appeal finished third in the 150th running of Canada's premier race, the Queen's Plate.

On July 12 of 2009, the filly went to Fort Erie for the annual Prince of Wales Stakes and placed second behind Gallant but ahead of Queen's Plate winner Eye of the Leopard.

In the Alabama Stakes, she  finished second behind Careless Jewel.

Pedigree

References

2006 racehorse births
Thoroughbred family A1
Racehorses bred in Canada
Racehorses trained in Canada